Hridayame Sakshi is a 1977 Indian Malayalam-language film, directed by I. V. Sasi. The film stars Prem Nazir, Sharada, K. P. Ummer and Sankaradi in the lead roles. The film has musical score by M. S. Viswanathan.

Cast 
Prem Nazir as Murali
Sharada as Kamala
K. P. Ummer as Vasudevan
Sankaradi as Kurup
Bahadoor as Narayanan

Soundtrack 
The music was composed by M. S. Viswanathan and the lyrics were written by Sreekumaran Thampi.

References

External links 
 

1977 films
1970s Malayalam-language films
Films directed by I. V. Sasi
Films scored by M. S. Viswanathan